Sessums is an unincorporated community located in Oktibbeha County, Mississippi.

References

Unincorporated communities in Oktibbeha County, Mississippi
Unincorporated communities in Mississippi